Chennakesava Temple at Belur is one of the largest and most famous Hindu temples dedicated to Lord Chennakesava (Vishnu).

Other temples dedicated to Chennakesava include:

 Chennakesava Temple, Somanathapura